Soundaryame Varuga Varuga is a 1980 Indian Tamil-language romance film written and directed by Sridhar. The film stars Sivachandran, Sathaar, Sripriya and Rati. It was released on 15 January 1980.

Plot

Cast 
 Sivachandran
 Sathaar
 Prakash

 Sripriya
 Rati
Pandari Bai

Production 
Soundaryame Varuga Varuga was written and directed by Sridhar, and produced by B. Bharani Reddy of Sri Bharani Chitra. Cinematography was handled by R. K. Tiwari, and editing by C. Subbarao.

Soundtrack 
The soundtrack was composed by  Vijaya Bhaskar, and the lyrics were written by Vaali.

Release and reception 
Soundaryame Varuga Varuga was released on 15 January 1980. Kaushikan of Kalki panned the film for its story, but appreciated the music and Prakash's performance.

References

External links 
 

1980s romance films
1980s Tamil-language films
Films directed by C. V. Sridhar
Films scored by Vijaya Bhaskar
Films with screenplays by C. V. Sridhar
Indian romance films